Anicius Petronius Probus ( 395–406 AD) was a politician of the Western Roman Empire.

Biography 

A member of the gens Anicia, he was the son of Sextus Claudius Petronius Probus (consul in 371) and of Anicia Faltonia Proba; his elder brothers were Anicius Hermogenianus Olybrius and Anicius Probinus (consuls in 395), and his sister was Anicia Proba.

In 395, he is attested as quaestor elected by the Emperor. In 406, Anicius was consul contemporaneously with the Eastern Emperor Arcadius. One of his consular diptychs is preserved at the Museo del tesoro della cattedrale di Aosta, and depicts Emperor Honorius.

Probus was a Christian.

Notes

Bibliography 
 , an inscription set up by Probus and his brother Probinus in honour of their mother.
 Arnold Hugh Martin Jones, John Martindale, John Morris, The Prosopography of the Later Roman Empire (PLRE). vol. 1, Cambridge 1971, p. 639.

4th-century Christians
4th-century Romans
5th-century Christians
5th-century Romans
5th-century Roman consuls
Probus, Petronius
Imperial Roman consuls
Petronii